Institute of Economics and Management (ECOMEN) was a private university in Estonia from 1993 to 2013.

It was founded in Sillamäe and from 1999 to 2006 it hold the name Sillamäe Institute of Economics and Management.

See also
 List of universities in Estonia

References

Business schools in Estonia
1993 establishments in Estonia
Educational institutions established in 1993